Beerepalli may refer to:
Beerepalli, Anantapur, a village in Andhra Pradesh, India
Beerepalli, Krishnagari, a village in Tamil Nadu, India